Cornea plana 2 (CNA2) is an extremely rare congenital hereditary deformity of the eye surface, leading to severe decrease in corneal curvature. There is evidence that cornea plana 2 is caused by mutations in KERA gene encoding keratocan.

See also
 Cornea plana 1

References

External links 

Congenital Clouding of the Cornea - eMedicine; by Noah S Scheinfeld, MD, JD, FAAD and Benjamin D Freilich, MD, FACS

Eye diseases